The Former Residence of Sun Yat-sen, located at 7 Xiangshan Road (aka ) in the French Concession area of Shanghai, China, near Fuxing Park to the east, was the residence of the Chinese revolutionary Dr. Sun Yat-sen (1866–1925)

Sun Yat-sen lived in this house from 1918 with his wife Soong Ching-ling. After his death, Sun's wife continued to live here until 1937. There is now an exhibition centre presenting Sun Yat-sen's life, together with some artifacts and a statue of Sun Yat-sen outside.

See also
 Cuiheng, Sun Yat-sen's birthplace
 Sun Yat Sen Memorial House, Macau
 Song Ching Ling Memorial Residence in Shanghai
 Former Residence of Zhou Enlai in Shanghai (to the south)
 Major National Historical and Cultural Sites (Shanghai)

References

Museums with year of establishment missing
Museums in Shanghai
Houses in Shanghai
Biographical museums in China
Historic house museums in China
Sun Yat-sen
Major National Historical and Cultural Sites in Shanghai